A list of the published works of Tony Hoagland, American poet.

Poetry 
Collections

 Priest Turned Therapist Treats Fear of God, Minneapolis, MN: Graywolf Press, 
 Recent Changes in the Vernacular, Espanola, NM: Tres Chicas Books, 
 Application for Release from the Dream, Minneapolis, MN: Graywolf Press, 
 Unincorporated Persons in the Late Honda Dynasty, St. Paul, MN: Graywolf Press, 
 What Narcissism Means to Me, St. Paul, MN: Graywolf Press, 
 Donkey Gospel, St. Paul, MN: Graywolf Press, 
 Sweet Ruin, Madison, WI: University of Wisconsin Press, 
Chapbooks and broadsides
 Into The Mystery, Cambridge, MA: Yellow Moon Press
 Don't Tell Anyone, Venice, CA: Hollyridge Press
 Little Oceans, Venice, CA: Hollyridge Press
 Hard Rain, Venice, CA: Hollyridge Press
 History of Desire, Tucson, AZ: Moon Pony Press
 Talking to Stay Warm, Minneapolis, MN: Coffee House Press
 A Change in Plans, Sierra Vista, CA: San Pedro Press
List of poems

Literary criticism and essays 
 The Art of Voice: Poetic Principles and Practice, (posthumous, with Kay Cosgrove). New York City, NY: W. W. Norton & Company 
 Twenty Poems That Could Save America and Other Essays, St. Paul, MN: Graywolf Press, 
 Real Sofistikashun: Essays on Poetry and Craft, St. Paul, MN: Graywolf Press, 

Bibliographies by writer
Bibliographies of American writers